M.U.D. TV (Mad Ugly Dirty TV) is a Business simulation game developed by Realmforge Studios and published by Kalypso Media for Microsoft Windows released on February 23, 2010. The game is centered on running a multi-media broadcasting business. The game is meant as a parody of many modern news stations.

Reception
The Australian video game talk show Good Game'''s two reviewers gave the game a 6/10 and 8/10.

The Metacritic website has a global score of 53, based on 6 reviews, indicating a "mixed or average" reception. The best review was from PC Games (Germany), which reviewed it 78%.

See alsoMad TV'', 1991 game with a similar premise

References

External links
M.U.D. TV Official site

Business simulation games
Cooperative video games
Games for Windows certified games
2010 video games
Video games developed in Germany
Windows games
Windows-only games